Four Mile Creek is a stream in Preble County and Butler County, Ohio, in the United States.

Four Mile Creek was named from its distance,  from Fort Hamilton.

Location

Mouth: Confluence with the Great Miami River at 
Source: Preble County at

Flow rate
A USGS stream gauge on the creek near Hamilton recorded a mean annual discharge of  during water years 1938-1960.

See also
List of rivers of Ohio

References

Rivers of Butler County, Ohio
Rivers of Preble County, Ohio
Rivers of Ohio
Tributaries of the Ohio River